Ivyside Farm is a historic home and farm located at Claymont, New Castle County, Delaware.  It was built in three sections with the earliest dated to about 1795. The earliest section is a -story, two bay, single pile structure built of Brandywine granite. The second section was constructed in 1853, and is a two-story, three-bay, side-hall, double pile structure of Brandywine granite. It is in the Greek Revival style. In 1907, a two-story, gabled, shingle-sided section was added to the 1795 original structure and a two-story frame addition was built on the second section.  Also on the property are a contributing large frame barn, wagon or carriage house, a corncrib and a chicken house.

It was listed on the National Register of Historic Places in 1982.

References

Houses on the National Register of Historic Places in Delaware
Greek Revival houses in Delaware
Houses completed in 1795
Houses in New Castle County, Delaware
Farms on the National Register of Historic Places in Delaware
National Register of Historic Places in New Castle County, Delaware